A60 or A-60 may refer to:

 A60 road, a road connecting Loughborough and Doncaster via Nottingham in England
 A60 highway, a proposed road to connect Valladolid and Leon in Spain
 A60 Highway, a highway which bypasses the southern suburbs of the city of Varese, Italy
 Autobahn 60, a highway in Germany
 Benoni Defense, in the Encyclopaedia of Chess Openings
 Beriev A-60, a Soviet and then Russian airborne laser flying laboratory
 London Underground A60 Stock, rolling stock used on the Metropolitan and East London lines on the London Underground
 Samsung Galaxy A60, smartphone released in 2019
 A model number of the Austin Cambridge car range
 A-series light bulb of diameter 60 mm